The People's Defence Forces (HPG) is the military wing of the group Kurdistan Workers' Party (PKK). During the 7th Congress of the PKK in January 2000, the HPG replaced the former military wing of the PKK, the People's Liberation Army of Kurdistan (Artêşa Rizgariya Gelê Kurdistan, ARGK). The replacement was intended to demonstrate the search for a peaceful solution of the Kurdish-Turkish conflict, after the capture of Abdullah Öcalan in 1999. The HPG played an active in the peace negotiations between the Turkish Government and the PKK in 2013, as it hosted a delegation consisting of several politicians from the Peace and Democracy Party (BDP) and members of the Turkish Human Rights Association (IHD) and agreed to release soldiers of the Turkish army as well as a Turkish politician, who they held captive.  In 2014, the HPG was involved in the fight against the Islamic State of Iraq and the Levant (ISIS) in Sinjar.

As far as can be judged from the publications, one of the basic HPG factions is called "Karela Forces" (or "Al-Karila Forces") and this name mainly mentioned in Arabic texts regarding HPG actions in northern Iraq and Turkey (in Arabic texts, this name is often used as an alternative name for People's Defence Forces in general.)

References

Apoist organizations in Turkey
Anti-ISIL factions in Iraq
Anti-ISIL factions in Turkey
Kurdistan Workers' Party
Military wings of socialist parties
Organisations designated as terrorist by the United Kingdom
Organizations based in Asia designated as terrorist
Organizations designated as terrorist
Rebel groups in Turkey